Žydrūnas is a Lithuanian masculine given name and  may refer to:

Žydrūnas Ilgauskas (born 1975), retired Lithuanian professional basketball player and assistant general manager for the Cleveland Cavaliers
Žydrūnas Karčemarskas (born 1983), Lithuanian professional footballer currently playing for Turkish club Gaziantepspor
Žydrūnas Savickas (born 1975), Lithuanian strongman
Žydrūnas Savickas (born 1991), Lithuanian racing cyclist
Žydrūnas Urbonas (born 1976), Lithuanian professional basketball player currently playing in Ukrainian championship for BC Donetsk

Lithuanian masculine given names